Żelechów  (Yiddish זשעלעכאָוו) is a town in east Poland in Masovian Voivodeship in Garwolin County. More than 4000 people live in the town. It is a local centre, supporting nearby farmers and housing a few high schools.

Żelechów has a recorded history that goes back over 700 years. In 1447 Żelechów gained city rights. Until World War II, it was inhabited mostly by Jews. Traces of their presence are still visible in the architecture of the town. There are a few historic buildings in the town.

Geography

Location
Żelechów is located near border of Masovian and Lublin Voivodeships. During the period between 1975 and 1998 Żelechów was in Siedlce Voivodship. Before 1795, Żelechów had strong connections with Lesser Poland. So it is located between three geographical regions: Podlaskie, Lubelszczyzna and Masovia.

The surrounding landscape was formed during the ice age when the whole area was covered with ice. The area around Żelechów is surrounded by fields and few forests.

Area
This is much more than the actual built-up area: 77.8% of the whole area is agriculture usage, 3.6% of the area are forests, and 18.6% is unused or built up.

Demography

Żelechów is 65th town in Masovian Voivodship in respect of number of inhabitants (with total number of towns in Masovian Voivodship of 85). It is the smallest town in Garwolin County. In 2006 number of inhabitants of the town of Żelechów made 47,7% of the total population of Gmina Żelechów. Detailed demography information from December 31, 2006:

Poles are dominant nation in the town, there is also a group of the Romani people.

Name
The name was used in the time of Middle Ages. It can be found in a document (written in time between 1335 and 1342) as Zelechov. In a later document written by Jan Długosz (1470–1480) as Zyelyechow. The name derives from the Polish forename Żelech , which is a simplified form of Żelisław.

Jews used to call it Zshelikhov and it was incorporated as such in the Jewish history after Jewish scholars found a religious meaning to its name. In Hebrew, the name זליחוב translates as זה לי חוב, which means "it is my obligation" [to be a Jew and engage in mitzvot and good deeds].

Names in other languages:
Russian: Желехув
Hebrew: ז'לחוב, ז'ליחוב
Yidish: זשעלעכאָוו, זשעליכאָוו

History

The first record of Żelechów dates back to 1282, and the city rights were gained in 1447. Żelechów was a private town, first owned by the family of Ciołek (who later changed their surname to Żelechowski). It was a local center of trade and an important city until the Deluge (the war with Sweden). At that time the town was greatly devastated, and dozens of people died (also due to diseases). In the first half of the 17th century Jews first settled in Żelechów. The owners of the town changed frequently, one of them was Ignacy Wyssogota Zakrzewski - the first President of Warsaw.

After the Partitions of Poland Żelechów belonged to Austria. Then in the time of the Napoleonic Wars it was within the borders of the Duchy of Warsaw, and after the Congress of Vienna it was finally placed in Congress Poland, which was in fact controlled by Russia. Joachim Lelewel was a deputy to the Sejm from Żelechów county in years 1828 - 1831. Romuald Traugutt lived here in 1845, he served as officer of a ruff of sappers. During the January Uprising near Żelechów, few skirmishes took place.

After the uprising the Russian government took the decision to punish those who fought against them, who were generally nobility. Nearby peasants received land (which later belonged to nobility), and the city from that time onward was not owned by a single person. To keep the peace in the area, two cavalry companies and an artillery unit were placed in Żelechów. They brought prosperity, because their needs had to be supported by the townspeople. In that time, Żelechów started to be especially well known as a shoe production center.

In 1880 a great fire burned a large part of the town, but it was rebuilt quickly with brick houses replacing wooden ones. In 1919 about 7,800 inhabitants lived in the city. During the interwar period about 800 firms resided in Żelechów (mainly shops and handicrafts). In 1939 in Żelechów lived about 8,500 inhabitants, who were mostly Jews (5,800 people). Before the Great Wars, many Jews fled to America, mainly to Costa Rica, where they founded a new Jewish community.

When the Nazi Germany occupied Poland, a ghetto was created in a small area in the city, placing about 10,000 Jews there, mainly from Żelechów but also from other cities of Poland. In September 1942, the liquidation of the ghetto began, where people were transported to Treblinka extermination camp, but due to the chaos many tried to escape. About 1,000 died in Żelechów this time shot by German soldiers.

On July 17 of 1944 the Red Army entered Żelechów, ending the war there. Only 50 Jews remained alive in the city. At this time about 4,000 people lived in Żelechów, and this number has not changed much to this day.

Historic buildings
Parish, neo-baroque church. Construction begun in 1692 and ended in 1728. In 1894 full rebuild took place. The church is located in place where a wooden church stands, built before 1326.
St Stanislaus church built in 1741. It is the oldest building in Żelechów preserved in the same state as it was built.
Classical palace, construction begun in 1726 and ended lastly in 1838.
Town hall built in eighteenth century located in the center of the Market Square.
Rynek was built in the end of the 18th century on the order of Ignacy Wyssogota Zakrzewski.
Tomb of Ordęga family in the cemetery built in 1852. There are also some headstones from nineteenth century.
Jewish cemetery containing few headstones.
Many wooden houses built in nineteenth century.

Economy
Żelechów is a centre supporting nearby farmers. There are over 500 firms in the town, mainly small family shops, handicrafts or service. Bigger firms work in the fields of machinery, footwear and the floor industry.

Education
Żelechów is a local centre of education, up to secondary school. There are many schools offering education in different areas of knowledge.

Transport
The voivodship road 807 passes through the town.

Sport
Local football club Sęp Żelechów was founded in 1921. The club competes at regional league level (Masovian regional league, Siedlce).

Famous persons
Wacław Rzewuski – owner of Żelechów, the branch church was built on his order.
Levi Yitzchok of Berditchev – rabbi and Hasidic leader, who lived in Żelechów for 10 years.
Ignacy Wyssogota Zakrzewski – owner of Żelechów. Zakrzewski was the first President of Warsaw. He is buried in Żelechów cemetery.
Joachim Lelewel – politician, deputy to Sejm from Żelechów county.
 Isaac Meir Weissenberg –  Yiddish-language writer born in Żelechów.
Romuald Traugutt – Polish general and war hero, who lived in Żelechów.
 Shalom Zisman – Israeli politician born in Żelechów.
Janusz Józefowicz – Polish actor and director, who comes from Żelechów.

References

External links

 Official website (in Polish)
 History of Jewish society of Żelechów
 Jewish Community in Żelechów on Virtual Shtetl

Cities and towns in Masovian Voivodeship
Garwolin County
Lublin Governorate
Warsaw Voivodeship (1919–1939)
Holocaust locations in Poland